Richard Kerswell FRS is a British fluid mechanics scientist and the G. I. Taylor Professor of Fluid Mechanics. He was elected Fellow of the Royal Society in 2012.

He received his Doctor of Philosophy from the Massachusetts Institute of Technology in 1992 and was a mathematics professor in the University of Newcastle from 1992 to 1996 and in Bristol University from 1996 until he moved  to the University of Cambridge in 2017.

References

Massachusetts Institute of Technology alumni
Academics of the University of Bristol
Academics of Durham University
Professors of the University of Cambridge
Fellows of the Royal Society
Year of birth missing (living people)
Living people